David Fung (born on August 17, 1988) is a concert pianist. Fung was born in Sydney, Australia.

Early life and education
Fung attended James Ruse Agricultural High School in Sydney, where he received the James Ruse Medal for Dux and the Medal for Music. He graduated with a Universities Admission Index of 100 and earned a scholarship to study the M.B.B.S. at the University of New South Wales. Following two years of medical school, Fung left to pursue an education and training in music.

Musical education and training
In 2002, Fung won the ABC Symphony Australia Young Performers Awards, after four rounds of competition which culminated in his performance of Rachmaninoff's Rhapsody on a Theme of Paganini with the Sydney Symphony Orchestra during the concerto finals at the Sydney Opera House Concert Hall.  He has subsequently appeared with the major orchestras of Australia and recorded a CD with the ABC Classics label.

Deciding to pursue a career in music, Fung transferred in 2003 to the Colburn School in Los Angeles to study with John Perry. Fung was the first student of piano to be admitted to the Colburn Conservatory in its inaugural year; in May 2007, he became the first pianist to graduate from the Conservatory. Fung also holds an Artist Diploma from the Colburn School and Master's and Doctorate degrees from Yale University, where he studied with Claude Frank and Peter Frankl. He also studied with Arie Vardi in Germany at the Hochschule für Musik, Theater und Medien Hannover.

Career
Fung has appeared with orchestras including the Cleveland Orchestra, Detroit Symphony Orchestra, Israel Philharmonic Orchestra, the Los Angeles Chamber Orchestra, the Los Angeles Philharmonic, the National Orchestra of Belgium, the National Taiwan Symphony Orchestra, the New Japan Philharmonic Orchestra, the Saint Paul Chamber Orchestra, the San Diego Symphony, the San Francisco Symphony, and the Tampere Philharmonic Orchestra, and with the major orchestras in Australia, including the Melbourne Symphony Orchestra, the Queensland Symphony Orchestra, and the Sydney Symphony Orchestra.

In July 2016, Fung’s debut with the Cleveland Orchestra at the Blossom Music Festival was “everything you could wish for” (Cleveland Classical) and he was further praised as an “agile and alert interpreter of Mozart’s crystalline note-spinning” (The Plain Dealer). In the following week, he performed Rachmaninoff’s Rhapsody on a Theme of Paganini at the Beijing National Stadium for their Olympic Summer Festival. Other highlights of the season include invitations to the Louvre, the Palais des Beaux-Arts, the Kennedy Center, the Baryshnikov Arts Center, and a recital tour in China at major venues including the Beijing Concert Hall, Shanghai Oriental Art Center, Guangzhou Opera House, and the Tianjin Grand Theater.

Fung has performed at the Aspen Music Festival, Caramoor, the Edinburgh International Festival, the Ravinia Festival, then Atlantic Music Festival, Music at Menlo in California, New York's Carnegie Hall and Merkin Hall, Los Angeles' Walt Disney Concert Hall and Royce Hall, Wigmore Hall in London, Scotland's Queen’s Hall, Belgium's La Monnaie, Toronto's Glenn Gould Studio, the Gewandhaus, the Sydney Opera House, the National Concert Hall in Taiwan, the Seoul Arts Center, and Israel's Mann Auditorium. His debut at the Edinburgh International Festival Queen’s Hall Series was acclaimed as being “impossibly virtuosic, prodigiously talented... and probably [doing] ten more impossible things daily before breakfast,” by Jonas Green in the Edinburgh Guide. His recitals at the Edinburgh International Festival were especially well received.

Fung was a laureate of the prestigious Queen Elisabeth International Music Competition and the 12th Arthur Rubinstein International Piano Master Competition in Tel Aviv, where he was also awarded the Prize for Best Classical Concerto, and Best Performance of Chamber Music.

In July 2021, Fung was appointed Assistant Professor of Piano at the University of British Columbia School of Music, where he also curates the Steinway Spirio Piano Series at the Chan Centre for the Performing Arts 

Besides the piano, Fung also plays the harpsichord and violin.

Personal life
Fung is proficient in Chinese and Italian. He is in a relationship with American countertenor Daniel Moody (countertenor).

Recordings 
In addition to recording for Naxos and ABC Classics, Fung has recorded three albums with Los Angeles-based Yarlung Records.

In 2005, Fung’s debut album with Yarlung Records linked the virtuosity in the piano music of Liszt and Ravel: Liszt’s Sonata in B minor and Les jeux d’eau à la villa d’Este, with Ravel’s Jeux d’Eau and La Valse. His second album with Yarlung, Evening Conversations, featured a solo recital of intimate works by composers ranging from Mozart to Tan Dun. Evening Conversations was praised as “an overall favorite” by James Harrington in the American Record Guide and was named one of the Top 10 Recordings of 2011 by Linn Records.  As a chamber musician, Fung has recorded the complete violin and piano works of American composer Lawrence Dillon with violinist Danielle Belen (Naxos) and partnered with Canadian ‘cellist Elinor Frey in her album Dialoghi (Yarlung).

Notes

External links
Official homepage

Australian classical pianists
Male classical pianists
Living people
People educated at James Ruse Agricultural High School
University of New South Wales alumni
Yale School of Music alumni
21st-century classical pianists
Year of birth missing (living people)
21st-century Australian male musicians
21st-century Australian musicians